The Best Of is the first greatest hits album by English electronic music duo Groove Armada. It was released on 8 November 2004.

Track listing

Charts

Weekly charts

Year-end charts

Certifications

References 

Groove Armada albums
2004 greatest hits albums